Jacopo II da Carrara (or Giacomo II) (died 1350), of the Carraresi family, was the capitano del popolo of Padua from 1345 until his death. Though he assumed power through forged documents and political murder, he was a patron of art and literature. He succeeded in bringing Francesco Petrarca to Padua for a time, and his own son, Francesco I, was an artisan. Jacopo also introduced the carrarino as the currency of Padua.

In May 1345 Jacopo murdered the incumbent prince, Marsiglietto Papafava. He in turn was assassinated in 1350. At his death he was still illiterate, a fact he much regretted, as Petrus Paulus Vergerius wrote in a letter to his grandson Ubertino. His younger brother Jacopino succeeded him as capitano, to be succeeded in turn by Francesco. In 1351 Petrarca wrote a eulogy for the deceased Jacopo, Andriolo de Santi was commissioned to carve his sepulchre, and Guariento di Arpo began work on a fresco of the coronation of the Virgin Mary to adorn his tomb in the church of Sant' Agostino (it was moved, following bombing during the Second World War, to the Church of the Eremitani).

1350 deaths
Lords of Padua
14th-century Italian nobility
Assassinated Italian people
Year of birth unknown
Da Carrara family